Felix Rijhnen (born July 9, 1990) is a German Olympic speed skater. 

He finished in 13th place in the 5000 m competition at the 2022 Winter Olympics. In the men's mass start competition he was disqualified. 

Rijhnen is a world champion in inline speed skating as well. In 2019 he became the first German to win the Berlin Marathon inline skating competition.

World Cup Podiums

References 

1990 births
Living people
German male speed skaters
Speed skaters at the 2022 Winter Olympics
Olympic speed skaters of Germany
Sportspeople from Darmstadt
21st-century German people